Wangchang Gewog (Dzongkha: ཝང་ལྕང་) is a gewog (village block) of Paro District, Bhutan. In 2002, the gewog had an area of 34.2 square kilometres and contained 7 chewogs and 278 households.

References

Gewogs of Bhutan
Paro District